Compton Bassett is a historic home in Upper Marlboro, Prince George's County, Maryland, United States, that was constructed ca. 1783. It is a two-story brick Georgian house, covered with cream-colored stucco, on a high basement of gray stucco. A two-story wing was added in 1928. Remaining outbuildings include a chapel to the southeast, a meat-house to the southwest, and a dairy to the northwest. Also on the property is a family burial ground.

The Hill family and descendants lived at the premise from 1699 to 1900.  Hills Bridge (700 meters to the southeast) has carried traffic over the Patuxent River here since a toll bridge was first constructed in 1852 by W.B. Hill.  Compton Bassett was listed on the National Register of Historic Places in 1983.  In July 2010 the house and grounds were acquired by the Maryland-National Capital Park and Planning Commission.

In an effort to slow-down the effects of time, in 2018 the house underwent a significant structural stabilization. MNCCPC engaged the nationally recognized restoration firm The Durable Restoration Company, working with a local firm to design and build the structural framework system to reinforce the external and internal portions of the house.

References

External links
The Durable Restoration Company
, including photo in 1977, at Maryland Historical Trust website

Historic American Buildings Survey in Maryland
Houses on the National Register of Historic Places in Maryland
Georgian architecture in Maryland
Houses completed in 1783
Houses in Prince George's County, Maryland
National Register of Historic Places in Prince George's County, Maryland